Amin Hossein Rahimi (born 1968) is an Iranian politician. He served in the majlis from 2008 and to 2012 and has been the minister of justice since 25 August 2021.

Biography
Rahimi was born in Malayer, Hamadan Province, in 1968. He was a Principlists member of the Majlis for Malayer in the eighth term between 2008 and 2012. Then he served as chief prosecutor in the Iranian Court of Audit. He was nominated as the minister of justice by Iranian President Ebrahim Raisi on 11 August 2021. His nomination was confirmed by the majlis on 25 August with 277 votes in favor which was the highest one given for Raisi's nominees.

References

External links

21st-century Iranian politicians
1968 births
Living people
Members of the 8th Islamic Consultative Assembly
Ministers of Justice of Iran
People from Malayer